Adam McDonald is an Australian reality-television series personality and auctioneer who starred alongside Lucas Callaghan in Aussie Pickers on A&E.  The show is an Australian adaptation of American Pickers.

McDonald's area of expertise is 20th-century and industrial antiques, and his work has been reviewed on the ABC television program Auction Room.

References

Further reading
 Picking up bargains can be fun
 Pickers in Paradise
 TV show to seek rich pickings

External links
 Aussie Pickers
 American Pickers

Antiques experts
Living people
Participants in Australian reality television series
Australian auctioneers
Year of birth missing (living people)